Ninrol Edgardo Medina Torres (born 26 August 1976) is a Honduran retired football defender.

He is current manager of Honduran Segunda Division side Arsenal de Roatán.

Club career
Medina came through the youth ranks at F.C. Motagua and first moved abroad to play in Mexico for Tigrillos Saltillo. He returned to Motagua after a year, but then again crossed the border to play in Costa Rica, where he played for Deportivo Saprissa alongside compatriot Amado Guevara, and another three years in Mexico. He joined Honduran side Vida in 2006 and finished his career as captain of Victoria. He scored 2 league goals for Motagua.

International career
Medina played for Honduras at the 1995 FIFA World Youth Championship in Qatar. Playing in central defense, Medina made his senior debut for the Honduras against Turkey on June 11, 1995. By 1999 he became a regular starter in the squad, playing next to Samuel Caballero and Reynaldo Clavasquín in the three-man defensive lineup favored by coach Ramón Maradiaga. He has earned a total of 53 caps, scoring no goals. He has represented his country in 19 FIFA World Cup qualification matches and Medina appeared in all six matches when Honduras took third place at the 2001 Copa América, converting a penalty during the shootout in the third-place victory over Uruguay. He also played fourteen times in the qualifying phase as Honduras narrowly missed out on the 2002 FIFA World Cup and played at the 1997 and 1999, as well as at the 2000 and 2003 CONCACAF Gold Cups.

His final international was an October 2004 FIFA World Cup qualification match against Guatemala.

Retirement
In summer 2012, Medina took over as coach of a local schoolboys team.

References

External links
 

1976 births
Living people
People from Francisco Morazán Department
Association football defenders
Honduran footballers
Honduras international footballers
2000 CONCACAF Gold Cup players
2001 Copa América players
2003 CONCACAF Gold Cup players
F.C. Motagua players
Deportivo Saprissa players
Club Atlético Zacatepec players
Atlante F.C. footballers
Irapuato F.C. footballers
C.D.S. Vida players
C.D. Victoria players
Liga Nacional de Fútbol Profesional de Honduras players
Liga MX players
Honduran expatriate footballers
Expatriate footballers in Costa Rica
Expatriate footballers in Mexico
Honduran football managers
F.C. Motagua managers